Chilocampyla psidiella is a moth of the family Gracillariidae. It is known from Cuba.

The larvae feed on Eugenia axillaris, Psidium guajava and Psidium guineense. They mine the leaves of their host plant. The mine has the form of a narrow serpentine track on the upper side of the leaf, later broadening into a large irregular blotch mine. The upper epidermis turns white and makes the mines very noticeable at a distance.

References

Acrocercopinae
Moths described in 1934
Endemic fauna of Cuba